Percy Ellin (21 June 1884 – 14 December 1959) was an Australian rules footballer who played with St Kilda and Richmond in the Victorian Football League (VFL).

Notes

External links 
 		
 

1884 births
1959 deaths
Australian rules footballers from Melbourne
Australian Rules footballers: place kick exponents
St Kilda Football Club players
Richmond Football Club players
Australian military personnel of World War I
People from Bentleigh, Victoria
Military personnel from Melbourne